Kausar Yazdani (born 1935 in Katalpur village, Uttar Pradesh) and died in 2011. He was an Indian Islamic scholar, author, journalist and activist and former Secretary for Dawah, Jamaat-e-Islami Hind. His specialisation is in comparative studies of Hindu scriptures and literature with Islamic literature. He stays in Delhi.

After retirement from the Jamaat he is engaged in translation of rare Islamic manuscripts into the Hindi language. Recently he has translated Bukhari in three volumes. He belongs to the famous Deobandi Muslim family of Maulana Husain Ahmad Madani.

Biography
Kausar Yazdani was born 1935 in Katalpur, Azamgarh district of Uttar Pradesh. His father was in the police department and retired when he was studying in class VII. He gained a BA in 1955 from Shibli College.

Education
He graduated from Shibli College, Azamgarh, and earned Master of Arts and Doctor of Philosophy degrees in the Hindi language from Agra University. He also completed the scholar certification at the Nadwatul Ulema, Lucknow, and Fazeelat from Rampur.

The topic of his PhD was Sufi Darshan evam Sadhna ka Kramik Vikas tatha Kutban, Manjhan evam Jaysee. (Development of Mysticism in Hindi with reference to the Poetry of Kutban, Manjhan and Jaysee).

Association and activism with Jamat Islami Hind

When Nadvi joined the Kanti, he did not know the Arabic language. But as he chose the dawah path, he decided to learn Arabic and studied the language from Maulana Salman Qasmi at Rampur. Then he took three years leave to study Arabic and Islamic sciences at Darul Uloom Nadwatul Ulama, Lucknow. Jamaat chief Maulana Abul lais allowed him to work from Lucknow and granted him the required leave.

References

1935 births
Living people
Indian Muslims
Journalists from Uttar Pradesh
Religious studies scholars
People from Azamgarh district